Singleton was an electoral district of the Legislative Assembly in the Australian colony (and state from 1901) of New South Wales created in 1894, existing from 1894 until 1913. It was named after the town of Singleton and replaced Patrick's Plains.

Members for Singleton

History
Prior to 1894 Singleton was in the district of Patrick's Plains. Multi-member constituencies were abolished in the 1893 redistribution, resulting in the creation of 76 new districts, including Singleton. Singleton largely replaced the Patrick's Plains along with part of the two member district of The Upper Hunter. As well as its namesake, Singleton included the towns of Belford, Branxton, Broke, Camberwell, Greta, Sedgefield, Warkworth, Wittingham and Wollombi.

In 1904 Singleton absorbed part of the seat of Northumberland and parts of the abolished seats of Robertson and Rylstone as a result of the 1903 New South Wales referendum which reduced the number of members of the Legislative Assembly from 125 to 90. The district was abolished in 1920 with the introduction of proportional representation and it was absorbed into the multi-member Maitland.

Election results

References

Former electoral districts of New South Wales
Constituencies established in 1894
1894 establishments in Australia
Constituencies disestablished in 1920
1920 disestablishments in Australia